Ekdal is a Swedish surname. Notable people with the surname include:

 Albin Ekdal (born 1989), Swedish footballer
 Hjalmar Ekdal (born 1998), Swedish footballer
 Lennart Ekdal (born 1953), Swedish journalist and television host

Swedish-language surnames